South Kentish Town is a disused London Underground station located in Kentish Town, north London, on the  branch of the Northern line.

It was opened in 1907 by the Charing Cross, Euston & Hampstead Railway but closed in 1924 due to low passenger usage. Latterly, it was on the Northern line's High Barnet branch between Camden Town and Kentish Town stations. The surface building survives on Kentish Town Road and is currently a retail unit.

History
South Kentish Town station was opened on 22 June 1907 by the Charing Cross, Euston & Hampstead Railway (CCE&HR) on its branch to Highgate (now Archway).
The station was planned to be called Castle Road; however, this was changed just before it opened. The Castle Road name had already been fired into the original Leslie Green tiles inside the station, so after the name change they were painted over with the revised name.

On 20 April 1924, trains of the City & South London Railway began to call at the station as the connection between the CCE&HR and C&SLR at  allowed the C&SLR to extend its services northwards along the CCE&HR's northern branches. This situation would only last for seven weeks. The station was temporarily closed following unofficial strike action at Lots Road Power Station during the afternoon of 5 June 1924. It was decided not to re-open the station after the power was restored, due to the very low number of passengers using it; in fact, since as early as 1908 some trains did not stop there. During the Blitz in the Second World War it was adapted for use as an air-raid shelter.

There have been occasional proposals to rebuild the platforms and the station as part of the redevelopment plans for Camden Town. The layout of South Kentish Town is similar to Kentish Town (also originally a CCE&HR station); with two  diameter lift-shafts and an  diameter spiral staircase. South Kentish Town now serves as an access point for permanent way works and as an emergency egress point for passenger services.

A prose piece called South Kentish Town was written in 1951 by John Betjeman which tells the fictional story of a passenger who became trapped in the disused station. It was based on a true incident where a train stopped at the station and mistakenly opened its doors, but in reality nobody became trapped.

As of 2016, the station building housed a retail unit and a yoga studio.  From 2021 it contained an escape room.

 Note: this template is wrong. For the 1907 former service, please read Hampstead instead of Northern, with a violet color instead of black.

References

External links
 London's Abandoned Tube Stations - South Kentish Town Includes platform level photos.
 South Kentish Town Station, circa 1909.

Disused London Underground stations
Disused railway stations in the London Borough of Camden
Former Charing Cross, Euston and Hampstead Railway stations
Railway stations in Great Britain opened in 1907
Railway stations in Great Britain closed in 1924
Kentish Town
Leslie Green railway stations
Railway stations located underground in the United Kingdom